Ma Mère is a 2004 erotic drama film written and directed by Christophe Honoré, based on the posthumous 1966 novel of the same name by French author Georges Bataille. The film follows the incestuous relationship between a 17-year-old boy and his attractive, promiscuous, 43-year-old mother. The film stars Isabelle Huppert, Louis Garrel, Emma de Caunes and Joana Preiss.

Honoré shot the film on location on the island of Gran Canaria, Canary Islands, Spain. Its dialogue is almost entirely in French with brief segments in Spanish, German and English. Film distribution company TLA Releasing released Ma Mère in France, at the Cannes Film Market, on 13 May 2004.

Plot
Seventeen-year-old Pierre has recently left a Catholic boarding school to live with his wealthy parents at their villa on the island of Gran Canaria. Pierre's father dies, leaving his mother Hélène to care for him. While in a restaurant, his mother reveals to him that she had been unfaithful to her husband many times with his knowledge and feels no shame about it. She then insists that her son accept her promiscuous ways. Soon after this, Pierre finds a closet full of his father's pornography. His reaction is to furiously masturbate and then to urinate on the magazine pages.

Hélène encourages her uninhibited sex partner Réa to have sex with Pierre. She does so in public at Gran Canaria's Yumbo Centrum, a popular shopping and nightlife complex. Hélène looks on longingly as the partially clothed couple copulates with passersby raising no objections.

Afterwards, Hélène includes her son in an orgy with her friends, including Hansi. After the orgy, Hélène decides that she must leave her son to travel. While saying goodbye to Pierre, she implies that something taboo has happened between them and that she must leave to prevent it from happening again.

Upon Hélène's departure, Hansi enters Pierre's life as a friend. She admits befriending Pierre at Hélène's encouragement but denies receiving a fee from her. Their friendship blossoms into a tender romance and they both fall in love. During their relationship, Hansi reveals that she has participated in sado-masochistic sex many times as a dominatrix with her friend Loulou as the willing masochist. She adds Hélène arranged these encounters as sexual exhibitions for tourists.

Hélène returns home with Réa. Upon arriving, she finds her son and Hansi socializing at a bar near the villa. Hélène and Pierre greet each other and chat while gazing into each other's eyes, with Hansi looking on jealously. Hélène invites her son to sleep with her. He agrees.

Hélène and Pierre enter the house's wine cellar. Hélène asks her son to cut her abdomen with a razor while he masturbates, and as he climaxes, she slits her own throat. Paramedics take away her body. Pierre says good-bye to his mother before the cremation. He enters the room where she lies in state and masturbates, exclaiming that he does not want to die as she is carried out.

Cast
 Isabelle Huppert as Hélène
 Louis Garrel as Pierre
 Emma de Caunes as Hansi
 Joana Preiss as Réa
 Jean-Baptiste Montagut as Loulou
 Dominique Reymond as Marthe
 Olivier Rabourdin as Robert
 Philippe Duclos as Father

Release

Theatrical
Ma Mère was rated NC-17 when it was released in the United States. The reason was "strong and aberrant sexual content". For the trailer the film was presented as an NC-17 film while mistakenly defining the rating as "under 17 requires supervision by parent or guardian" (which is the definition of the R rating).

Home media
An edited R-rated version running ten minutes shorter was released on DVD. The reason for the R rated version was "Strong Aberrant Sexuality, Some Language and Violent Images".

Reception

Rotten Tomatoes gives the film an approval rating of 14% based on reviews from 43 critics. The site's consensus reads "Pretentious, overly perverse and dull." On Metacritic the film has a score of 35% based on reviews from 19 critics, indicating "generally unfavorable reviews".

Scott Foundas of Variety called it "Respectable, tightly coiled, but ultimately unrewarding."

Jonathan Romney associated the film with the New French Extremity.

See also
 Isabelle Huppert on screen and stage
 List of NC-17 rated films
 List of French films of 2004

References

External links

 
 
 

2004 films
2004 drama films
2004 LGBT-related films
2000s erotic drama films
2000s French-language films
Arte France Cinéma films
Austrian drama films
Austrian LGBT-related films
BDSM in films
Films about prostitution in Spain
Films about widowhood
Films based on French novels
Films directed by Christophe Honoré
Films produced by Paulo Branco
Films set in the Canary Islands
Films shot in the Canary Islands
French erotic drama films
French LGBT-related films
Incest in film
LGBT-related drama films
Films about mother–son relationships
Portuguese drama films
Portuguese LGBT-related films
Spanish erotic drama films
Spanish LGBT-related films
2000s French films